A clinician is a health care professional typically employed at a skilled nursing facility or clinic. Clinicians work directly with patients rather than in a laboratory or as a researcher. A clinician may diagnose, treat, and otherwise care for patients. For example, psychologists, clinical pharmacists, clinical scientists, nurses, physiotherapists, dentists, optometrists, physician assistants and physicians can be considered clinicians. Many clinicians take comprehensive exams to be licensed and some complete graduate degrees (master's or doctorates) in their field of expertise.

A main function of a clinician is to manage a sick person in order to cure the effects of their illness.
The clinician can also consider the impact of illness upon the patient and his or her family, as well as other social factors.

See also 
 List of healthcare occupations

References 

Health care occupations